Ishtvan Sekech (born István Szekecs; 3 December 1939 – 28 January 2019) was Ukrainian football player and coach of Hungarian ethnic background. As a player, Sekech appeared in 223 matches and scored 43 goals in the Soviet championships. He captained Chornomorets Odesa from 1969 to 1971. Following his retirement, he became a manager and led FC Pakhtakor Tashkent from 1980 to 1985.

Coaching record

References

External links
 Kuzmiak, L. ''Talk with the past: Ishtvan Sekech. FC Karpaty Lviv website. December 3, 2013 

1939 births
2019 deaths
People from Berehove
Ukrainian people of Hungarian descent
Russian people of Hungarian descent
Soviet footballers
NK Veres Rivne players
FC Hoverla Uzhhorod players
FC Metalist Kharkiv players
FC Avanhard Ternopil players
FC Chornomorets Odesa players
FC Dynamo Kyiv players
PFC CSKA Moscow players
SKA Odesa players
SKA Lviv players
MFC Mykolaiv players
Soviet Top League players
Russian football managers
CSKA Pamir Dushanbe managers
FC Karpaty Lviv managers
Pakhtakor Tashkent FK managers
FC Podillya Khmelnytskyi managers
SKA Lviv managers
FC Temp Shepetivka managers
FC Okean Nakhodka managers
FC Luch Vladivostok managers
FC Zhemchuzhina Sochi managers
FC Mika managers
Ukrainian Premier League managers
FK Andijan managers
Merited Coaches of Ukraine
Association football forwards
Hungarian people of Russian descent